Mark A. Schneider is an American attorney and politician who served as a member of the Ohio House of Representatives from 2009 to 2011.

Education 
Schneider earned a Bachelor of Science degree in finance and accounting from the University of Michigan and a Juris Doctor from the Ohio State University Moritz College of Law.

Career 
A former Cuyahoga County assistant prosecutor, Schneider was a candidate for the Ohio House of Representatives and defeated incumbent Carol-Ann Schindel.

Schneider was sworn into his seat on January 5, 2009, beginning his two year term. Schneider faced former Representative Ron Young in the 2010 election. Young defeated Schneider.

References

Year of birth missing (living people)
Living people
Democratic Party members of the Ohio House of Representatives
University of Michigan alumni
21st-century American politicians
Ohio State University Moritz College of Law alumni